Jewish holidays, also known as Jewish festivals or Yamim Tovim (or singular  , in transliterated Hebrew []), are holidays observed in Judaism and by Jews throughout the Hebrew calendar. They include religious, cultural and national elements, derived from three sources: biblical mitzvot ("commandments"), rabbinic mandates, and the history of Judaism and the State of Israel.

Jewish holidays occur on the same dates every year in the Hebrew calendar, but the dates vary in the Gregorian. This is because the Hebrew calendar is a lunisolar calendar (based on the cycles of both the sun and moon), whereas the Gregorian is a solar calendar. Each holiday can only occur on certain days of the week, four for most, but five for holidays in Tevet and Shvat and six for Hanukkah (see Days of week on Hebrew calendar).

General concepts

Groupings
Certain terms are used very commonly for groups of holidays.
 The Hebrew-language term Yom Tov (יום טוב), sometimes referred to as "festival day," usually refers to the six biblically-mandated festival dates on which all activities prohibited on Shabbat are prohibited, except for some related to food preparation. These include the first and seventh days of Passover (the Feast of Unleavened Bread / the Feast of Matzot – Exodus 23:15, Deuteronomy 16:16), [first day of] Shavuot, both days of Rosh Hashanah, first day of Sukkot, and [first day of] Shemini Atzeret. By extension, outside the Land of Israel, the second-day holidays known under the rubric Yom tov sheni shel galuyot (literally, "Second Yom Tov of the Diaspora")—including Simchat Torah—are also included in this grouping. Colloquially, Yom Kippur, a biblically-mandated date on which even food preparation is prohibited, is often included in this grouping. The tradition of keeping two days of Yom Tov in the diaspora has existed since roughly 300 BCE.
 The English-language term High Holy Days (or High Holidays) refers to Rosh Hashanah and Yom Kippur collectively. Its Hebrew analogue, Yamim Nora'im (ימים נוראים), "Days of Awe”, is more flexible: it can refer just to those holidays, or to the Ten Days of Repentance, or to the entire penitential period, starting as early as the beginning of Elul, and (more rarely) ending as late as Shemini Atzeret.
 The term Three Pilgrimage Festivals (שלוש רגלים, shalosh regalim) refers to Passover (the Feast of Unleavened Bread / Feast of Matzot), Shavuot and Sukkot. Within this grouping Sukkot normally includes Shemini Atzeret and Simchat Torah.
 Ma'agal Hashana (מעגל השנה; "year cycle"), a more general term, is often used – especially in educational settings  – to refer to the overall study of the Jewish calendar, outlining the month by month events, with mitzvot and minhagim, and philosophical material, that occur over the course of the year.

Terminology used to describe holidays
Certain terminology is used in referring to different categories of holidays, depending on their source and their nature:

Shabbat (שבת) (Ashkenazi pron. from Yiddish shabbos), or Sabbath, is referred to by that name exclusively. Similarly, Rosh Chodesh (ראש חודש) is referred to by that name exclusively.
Yom tov (יום טוב) (Ashkenazi pron. from Yid. yontif) (lit., "good day"): See "Groupings" above.
 Moed (מועד) ("festive season"), plural moadim (מועדים), refers to any of the Three Pilgrimage Festivals of Passover, Shavuot and Sukkot. When used in comparison to Yom Tov, it refers to Chol HaMoed, the intermediate days of Passover and Sukkot.
 Ḥag or chag (חג) ("festival"), plural chagim (חגים), can be used whenever yom tov or moed is. It is also used to describe Hanukkah and Purim, as well as Yom Ha'atzmaut (Israeli Independence Day) and Yom Yerushalayim (Jerusalem Day).
 Ta'anit (תענית), or, less commonly, tzom (צום), refers to a fast. These terms are generally used to describe the rabbinic fasts, although tzom is used liturgically to refer to Yom Kippur as well.

"Work" on Sabbath and biblical holidays

The most notable common feature of Shabbat and the biblical festivals is the requirement to refrain from melacha on these days.  Melacha is most commonly translated as "work"; perhaps a better translation is "creative-constructive work".  Strictly speaking, Melacha is defined in Jewish law (halacha) by 39 categories of labor that were used in constructing the Tabernacle while the Jews wandered in the desert. As understood traditionally and in Orthodox Judaism:
On Shabbat and Yom Kippur all melacha is prohibited.
On a Yom Tov (other than Yom Kippur) which falls on a weekday, not Shabbat, most melacha is prohibited. Some melacha related to preparation of food is permitted.
On weekdays during Chol HaMoed, melacha is not prohibited per se. However, melacha should be limited to that required either to enhance the enjoyment of the remainder of the festival or to avoid great financial loss.
On other days, there are no restrictions on melacha.
In principle, Conservative Judaism understands the requirement to refrain from melacha in the same way as Orthodox Judaism.  In practice, Conservative rabbis frequently rule on prohibitions around melacha differently from Orthodox authorities. Still, there are a number of Conservative/Masorti communities around the world where Sabbath and Festival observance fairly closely resembles Orthodox observance.

However, many, if not most, lay members of Conservative congregations in North America do not consider themselves Sabbath-observant, even by Conservative standards.  At the same time, adherents of Reform Judaism and Reconstructionist Judaism do not accept halacha, and therefore restrictions on melacha, as binding at all. Jews fitting any of these descriptions refrain from melacha in practice only as they personally see fit.

Shabbat and holiday work restrictions are always put aside in cases of pikuach nefesh, which is saving a human life. At the most fundamental level, if there is any possibility whatsoever that action must be taken to save a life, Shabbat restrictions are set aside immediately, and without reservation.  Where the danger to life is present but less immediate, there is some preference to minimize violation of Shabbat work restrictions where possible. The laws in this area are complex.

Second day of biblical festivals

The Torah specifies a single date on the Jewish calendar for observance of holidays. Nevertheless, festivals of biblical origin other than Shabbat and Yom Kippur are observed for two days outside the land of Israel, and Rosh Hashanah is observed for two days even inside the land of Israel.

Dates for holidays on the Jewish calendar are expressed in the Torah as "day x of month y." Accordingly, the beginning of month y needs to be determined before the proper date of the holiday on day x can be fixed. Months in the Jewish calendar are lunar, and originally were thought to have been proclaimed by the blowing of a shofar. Later, the Sanhedrin received testimony of witnesses saying they saw the new crescent moon. Then the Sanhedrin would inform Jewish communities away from its meeting place that it had proclaimed a new moon. The practice of observing a second festival day stemmed from delays in disseminating that information.

 Rosh Hashanah. Because of holiday restrictions on travel, messengers could not even leave the seat of the Sanhedrin until the holiday was over. Inherently, there was no possible way for anyone living away from the seat of the Sanhedrin to receive news of the proclamation of the new month until messengers arrived after the fact. Accordingly, the practice emerged that Rosh Hashanah was observed on both possible days, as calculated from the previous month's start, everywhere in the world.
 Three Pilgrimage Festivals. Sukkot and Passover fall on the 15th day of their respective months. This gave messengers two weeks to inform communities about the proclamation of the new month. Normally, they would reach most communities within the land of Israel within that time, but they might fail to reach communities farther away (such as those in Babylonia or overseas). Consequently, the practice developed that these holidays be observed for one day within Israel, but for two days (both possible days as calculated from the previous month's start) outside Israel. This practice is known as yom tov sheni shel galuyot, "second day of festivals in exile communities".

 For Shavuot, calculated as the fiftieth day from Passover, the above issue did not pertain directly, as the "correct" date for Passover would be known by then. Nevertheless, the Talmud applies the same rule to Shavuot, and to the Seventh Day of Passover and Shemini Atzeret, for consistency.

Yom Kippur is not observed for two days anywhere because of the difficulty of maintaining a fast over two days.

 Shabbat is not observed based on a calendar date, but simply at intervals of seven days. Accordingly, there is never a doubt of the date of Shabbat, and it need never be observed for two days.

Adherents of Reform Judaism and Reconstructionist Judaism generally do not observe the second day of festivals, although some do observe two days of Rosh Hashanah.

Holidays of biblical and rabbinic (Talmudic) origin

Shabbat—The Sabbath

Jewish law (halacha) accords Shabbat (שבת) the status of a holiday, a day of rest celebrated on the seventh day of each week. Jewish law defines a day as ending at either sundown or nightfall, when the next day then begins. Thus,
 Shabbat begins just before sundown Friday night.  Its start is marked by the lighting of Shabbat candles and the recitation of Kiddush over a cup of wine.
 Shabbat ends at nightfall Saturday night.  Its conclusion is marked by the prayer known as Havdalah.
The fundamental rituals and observances of Shabbat include:
 Reading of the Weekly Torah portion
 Abbreviation of the Amidah in the three regular daily services to eliminate requests for everyday needs
 Addition of a musaf service to the daily prayer services
 Enjoyment of three meals, often elaborate or ritualized, through the course of the day
 Restraint from performing melacha (see above).
In many ways, halakha (Jewish law) sees Shabbat as the most important holy day in the Jewish calendar.
 It is the first holiday mentioned in the Tanakh (Hebrew Bible), and God was the first one to observe it (Genesis).
 The Torah reading on Shabbat has more sections of parshiot (Torah readings) than on Yom Kippur or any other Jewish holiday.
 The prescribed penalty in the Torah for a transgression of Shabbat prohibitions is death by stoning (Exodus 31), while for other holidays the penalty is (relatively) less severe.
 Observance of Shabbat is the benchmark used in halacha to determine whether an individual is a religiously observant, religiously reliable member of the community.

Rosh Chodesh—The New Month

Rosh Chodesh (ראש חודש) (lit., "head of the month") is a minor holiday or observance occurring on the first day of each month of the Jewish calendar, as well as the last day of the preceding month if it has thirty days.
 Rosh Chodesh observance during at least a portion of the period of the prophets could be fairly elaborate.
Over time there have been varying levels of observance of a custom that women are excused from certain types of work.
 Fasting is normally prohibited on Rosh Chodesh.
Beyond the preceding, current observance is limited to changes in liturgy.
In the month of Tishrei, this observance is superseded by the observance of Rosh Hashanah, a major holiday.
Related observances:
 The date of the forthcoming Rosh Chodesh is announced in synagogue on the preceding Sabbath.
 There are special prayers said upon observing the waxing moon for the first time each month.

Rosh Hashanah—The Jewish New Year

Selichot
The month of Elul that precedes Rosh Hashanah is considered to be a propitious time for repentance.  For this reason, additional penitential prayers called Selichot are added to the daily prayers, except on Shabbat. Sephardi Jews add these prayers each weekday during Elul.  Ashkenazi Jews recite them from the last Sunday (or Saturday night) preceding Rosh Hashanah that allows at least four days of recitations.

Rosh Hashanah

 Erev Rosh Hashanah (eve of the first day): 29 Elul
 Rosh Hashanah: 1–2 Tishrei

According to oral tradition, Rosh Hashanah (ראש השנה) (lit., "Head of the Year") is the Day of Memorial or Remembrance (יום הזכרון, Yom HaZikaron), and the day of judgment (יום הדין, Yom HaDin). God appears in the role of King, remembering and judging each person individually according to his/her deeds, and making a decree for each person for the following year.

The holiday is characterized by one specific mitzvah: blowing the shofar. According to the Torah, this is the first day of the seventh month of the calendar year, and marks the beginning of a ten-day period leading up to Yom Kippur. According to one of two Talmudic opinions, the creation of the world was completed on Rosh Hashanah.

Morning prayer services are lengthy on Rosh Hashanah, and focus on the themes described above: majesty and judgment, remembrance, the birth of the world, and the blowing of the shofar.  Ashkenazi Jews recite the brief Tashlikh prayer, a symbolic casting off of the previous year's sins, during the afternoon of Rosh Hashanah.

The Bible specifies Rosh Hashanah as a one-day holiday, but it is traditionally celebrated for two days, even within the Land of Israel. (See Second day of biblical festivals, above.)

Four New Years
The Torah itself does not use any term like "New Year" in reference to Rosh Hashanah. The Mishnah in Rosh Hashanah specifies four different "New Year's Days" for different purposes:
 1 Tishrei (conventional "Rosh Hashanah"):  "new year" for calculating calendar years, sabbatical-year (shmita) and jubilee cycles, and the age of trees for purposes of Jewish law; and for separating grain tithes.
 15 Shevat (Tu Bishvat): "new year" for trees–i.e., their current agricultural cycle and related tithes.
 1 Nisan: "New Year" for counting months and major festivals and for calculating the years of the reign of a Jewish king
 In biblical times, the day following 29 Adar, Year 1 of the reign of ___, would be followed by 1 Nisan, Year 2 of the reign of ___.
 In modern times, although the Jewish calendar year number changes on Rosh Hashanah, the months are still numbered from Nisan.
 The three pilgrimage festivals are always reckoned as coming in the order Passover-Shavuot-Sukkot. This can have religious law consequences even in modern times.
 1 Elul (Rosh Hashanah LaBehema):  "new year" for animal tithes.

Aseret Yemei Teshuva—Ten Days of Repentance

The first ten days of Tishrei (from the beginning of Rosh Hashana until the end of Yom Kippur) are known as the Ten Days of Repentance (עשרת ימי תשובה, Aseret Yemei Teshuva). During this time, in anticipation of Yom Kippur, it is "exceedingly appropriate" for Jews to practice teshuvah (literally "return"), an examination of one's deeds and repentance for sins one has committed against other people and God. This repentance can take the form of additional supplications, confessing one's deeds before God, fasting, self-reflection, and an increase of involvement with, or donations to, charity.

Tzom Gedalia—Fast of Gedalia

 Tzom Gedalia: 3 Tishrei
The Fast of Gedalia (צום גדליה) is a minor Jewish fast day. It commemorates the assassination of the governor of Judah, Gedalia, which ended any level of Jewish rule following the destruction of the First Temple.
 The assassination apparently occurred on Rosh Hashanah (1 Tishrei), but the fast is postponed to 3 Tishrei in respect for the holiday. It is further postponed to 4 Tishrei if 3 Tishrei is Shabbat.

As on all minor fast days, fasting from dawn to dusk is required, but other laws of mourning are not normally observed. A Torah reading is included in both the Shacharit and Mincha prayers, and a Haftarah is also included at Mincha. There are also a number of additions to the liturgy of both services.

Yom Kippur—Day of Atonement

 Erev Yom Kippur: 9 Tishrei
 Yom Kippur: 10 Tishrei (begins at sunset)

Yom Kippur (יום כיפור) is the holiest day of the year for Jews. Its central theme is atonement and reconciliation. This is accomplished through prayer and complete fasting—including abstinence from all food and drink (including water)—by all healthy adults. Bathing, wearing of perfume or cologne, wearing of leather shoes, and sexual relations are some of the other prohibitions on Yom Kippur—all them designed to ensure one's attention is completely and absolutely focused on the quest for atonement with God. Yom Kippur is also unique among holidays as having work-related restrictions identical to those of Shabbat. The fast and other prohibitions commence on 10 Tishrei at sunset—sunset being the beginning of the day in Jewish tradition.

A traditional prayer in Aramaic called Kol Nidre ("All Vows") is traditionally recited just before sunset. Although often regarded as the start of the Yom Kippur evening service—to such a degree that Erev Yom Kippur ("Yom Kippur Evening") is often called "Kol Nidre" (also spelled "Kol Nidrei")—it is technically a separate tradition. This is especially so because, being recited before sunset, it is actually recited on 9 Tishrei, which is the day before Yom Kippur; it is not recited on Yom Kippur itself (on 10 Tishrei, which begins after the sun sets).
 The words of Kol Nidre differ slightly between Ashkenazic and Sephardic traditions. In both, the supplicant prays to be released from all personal vows made to God during the year, so that any unfulfilled promises made to God will be annulled and, thus, forgiven. In Ashkenazi tradition, the reference is to the coming year; in Sephardic tradition, the reference is to the year just ended. Only vows between the supplicant and God are relevant. Vows made between the supplicant and other people remain perfectly valid, since they are unaffected by the prayer.

A Tallit (four-cornered prayer shawl) is donned for evening and afternoon prayers–the only day of the year in which this is done. In traditional Ashkenazi communities, men wear the kittel throughout the day's prayers. The prayers on Yom Kippur evening are lengthier than on any other night of the year. Once services reconvene in the morning, the services (in all traditions) are the longest of the year. In some traditional synagogues prayers run continuously from morning until nightfall, or nearly so. Two highlights of the morning prayers in traditional synagogues are the recitation of Yizkor, the prayer of remembrance, and of liturgical poems (piyyutim) describing the temple service of Yom Kippur.

Two other highlights happen late in the day. During the Minchah prayer, the haftarah reading features the entire Book of Jonah. Finally, the day concludes with Ne'ilah, a special service recited only on the day of Yom Kippur. Ne'ilah deals with the closing of the holiday, and contains a fervent final plea to God for forgiveness just before the conclusion of the fast. Yom Kippur comes to an end with the blowing of the shofar, which marks the conclusion of the fast. It is always observed as a one-day holiday, both inside and outside the boundaries of the Land of Israel.

Yom Kippur is considered, along with 15th of Av, as the happiest days of the year (Talmud Bavli—Tractate Ta'anit).

Sukkot—Feast of Booths (or Tabernacles)

 Erev Sukkot: 14 Tishrei
 Sukkot: 15–21 Tishrei (22 outside Israel)
 The first day of Sukkot is (outside Israel, first two days are) full yom tov, while the remainder of Sukkot has the status of Chol Hamoed, "intermediate days".
Sukkot (סוכות or סֻכּוֹת, sukkōt) or Succoth is a seven-day festival, also known as the Feast of Booths, the Feast of Tabernacles, or just Tabernacles. It is one of the Three Pilgrimage Festivals (shalosh regalim) mentioned in the Bible. Sukkot commemorates the years that the Jews spent in the desert on their way to the Promised Land, and celebrates the way in which God protected them under difficult desert conditions. The word sukkot is the plural of the Hebrew word sukkah, meaning booth. Jews are commanded to "dwell" in booths during the holiday. This generally means taking meals, but some sleep in the sukkah as well, particularly in Israel. There are specific rules for constructing a sukkah.

Along with dwelling in a sukkah, the principal ritual unique to this holiday is use of the Four Species: lulav (palm), hadass (myrtle), aravah (willow) and etrog (citron). On each day of the holiday other than Shabbat, these are waved in association with the recitation of Hallel in the synagogue, then walked in a procession around the synagogue called the Hoshanot.

The seventh day of the Sukkot is called Hoshanah Rabbah, the "Great Hoshanah" (singular of Hoshanot and the source of the English word hosanna). The climax of the day's prayers includes seven processions of Hoshanot around the synagogue. This tradition mimics practices from the Temple in Jerusalem. Many aspects of the day's customs also resemble those of Rosh Hashanah and Yom Kippur. Hoshanah Rabbah is traditionally taken to be the day of the "delivery" of the final judgment of Yom Kippur, and offers a last opportunity for pleas of repentance before the holiday season closes.

Shemini Atzeret and Simchat Torah

 Shemini Atzeret: 22 Tishrei (combined with Simchat Torah in Israel)
 Simchat Torah outside Israel: 23 Tishrei

The holiday of Shemini Atzeret (שמיני עצרת) immediately follows the conclusion of the holiday of Sukkot. The Hebrew word shemini means "eighth”, and refers to its position on "the eighth day" of Sukkot, actually a seven-day holiday. This name reflects the fact that while in many respects Shemini Atzeret is a separate holiday in its own right, in certain respects its celebration is linked to that of Sukkot. Outside Israel, meals are still taken in the Sukkah on this day.

The main notable custom of this holiday is the celebration of Simchat Torah (שמחת תורה), meaning "rejoicing with the Torah". This name originally referred to a special "ceremony": the last weekly Torah portion is read from Deuteronomy, completing the annual cycle, and is followed immediately by the reading of the first chapter of Genesis, beginning the new annual cycle. Services are especially joyous, and all attendees, young and old, are involved.

This ceremony so dominates the holiday that in Israel, where the holiday is one day long, the whole holiday is often referred to as Simchat Torah. Outside Israel, the holiday is two days long; the name Shemini Atzeret is used for the first day, while the second is normally called Simchat Torah.

Hanukkah—Festival of Lights

 Erev Hanukkah: 24 Kislev
 Hanukkah: 25 Kislev – 2 or 3 Tevet

The story of Hanukkah (חנוכה) is preserved in the books of the First and Second Maccabees. These books are not part of the Tanakh (Hebrew Bible), they are apocryphal books instead. The miracle of the one-day supply of olive oil miraculously lasting eight days is first described in the Talmud (Shabbat 21b), written about 600 years after the events described in the books of Maccabees.

Hanukkah marks the defeat of Seleucid Empire forces that had tried to prevent the people of Israel from practicing Judaism. Judah Maccabee and his brothers destroyed overwhelming forces, and rededicated the Temple in Jerusalem. The eight-day festival is marked by the kindling of lights—one on the first night, two on the second, and so on—using a special candle holder called a Hanukkiah, or a Hanukkah menorah.

Religiously, Hanukkah is a minor holiday. Except on Shabbat, restrictions on work do not apply. Aside from the kindling of lights, formal religious observance is restricted to changes in liturgy. Hanukkah celebration tends to be informal and based on custom rather than law. Three widely practiced customs include:
 Consumption of foods prepared in oil, such as potato pancakes or sufganiyot, commemorating the miracle of oil
 Playing the game of dreidel (called a sevivon in Hebrew), symbolizing Jews' disguising of illegal Torah study sessions as gambling meetings during the period leading to the Maccabees' revolt
 Giving children money, especially coins, called Hanukkah gelt.  However, the custom of giving presents is of far more recent, North American, origin, and is connected to the gift economy prevalent around North American Christmas celebrations.

Tenth of Tevet

 Asarah B'Tevet: 10 Tevet
The Tenth of Tevet (עשרה בטבת, Asarah B'Tevet) is a minor fast day, marking the beginning of the siege of Jerusalem as outlined in 2 Kings 25:1

And it came to pass in the ninth year of his reign, in the tenth month, in the tenth day of the month, that Nebuchadnezzar king of Babylon came, he and all his army, against Jerusalem, and encamped against it; and they built forts against it round about.

This fast's commemoration also includes other events occurring on 8, 9 and 10 Tevet.

This fast is observed like other minor fasts (see Tzom Gedalia, above). This is the only minor fast that can fall on a Friday under the current fixed Jewish calendar.

Tu Bishvat—New Year of the Trees

 Tu Bishvat: 15 Shevat

Tu Bishvat (ט"ו בשבט) (lit., "fifteenth of Shevat”, as ט״ו is the number "15" in Hebrew letters), is the new year for trees. It is also known as חג האילנות (Ḥag ha-Ilanot, Festival of Trees), or ראש השנה לאילנות (Rosh ha-Shanah la-Ilanot, New Year for Trees). According to the Mishnah, it marks the day from which fruit tithes are counted each year. Starting on this date, the biblical prohibition on eating the first three years of fruit (orlah) and the requirement to bring the fourth year fruit (neta revai) to the Temple in Jerusalem were counted.

During the 17th century, Rabbi Yitzchak Luria of Safed and his disciples created a short seder, called Hemdat ha‑Yamim, reminiscent of the seder that Jews observe on Passover, that explores the holiday's Kabbalistic themes. This Tu Bishvat seder has witnessed a revival in recent years.  More generally, Tu Bishvat is celebrated in modern times by eating various fruits and nuts associated with the Land of Israel.

Traditionally, trees are planted on this day.  Many children collect funds leading up to this day to plant trees in Israel.  Trees are usually planted locally as well.

Purim—Festival of Lots

 Fast of Esther: normally 13 Adar
 Purim: 14 Adar
 Shushan Purim: 15 Adar
 In leap years on the Hebrew calendar, the above dates are observed in the Second Adar (Adar Sheni). The 14th and 15th of First Adar (Adar Rishon) are known as Purim KatanPurim KatanPurim Katan (פורים קטן) (lit., "small Purim") is observed on the 14th and 15th of First Adar in leap years. These days are marked by a small increase in festivity, including a prohibition on fasting, and slight changes in the liturgy.

Ta'anit Esther–Fast of EstherTa'anit Esther (תענית אסתר), or "Fast of Esther", is named in honor of the fast of Esther and her court as Esther prepared to approach the king unbidden to invite him and Haman to a banquet. It commemorates that fast, as well as one alluded to later in the Book of Esther, undertaken as the Jews prepared to battle their enemies.

This fast is observed like other minor fasts (see Tzom Gedalia, above). While normally observed on 13 Adar, the eve of Purim, this fast is advanced to Thursday, 11 Adar, when 13 Adar falls on Shabbat.

Purim and Shushan Purim

Purim (פורים) commemorates the events that took place in the Book of Esther. The principal celebrations or commemorations include:
 The reading of the Megillah. Traditionally, this is read from a scroll twice during Purim–once in the evening and again in the morning. Ashkenazim have a custom of making disparaging noises at every mention of Haman's name during the reading.
 The giving of Mishloakh Manot, gifts of food and drink to friends and neighbors.
 The giving of Matanot La'evyonim, gifts to the poor and the needy.
 The Purim meal (Se'udat Purim or Purim Se'udah). This meal is traditionally accompanied by consumption of alcohol, often heavy, although Jewish sages have warned about the need to adhere to all religious laws even in a drunken state.
Several customs have evolved from these principal commemorations. One widespread custom to act out the story of Purim. The Purim spiel, or Purim play, has its origins in this, although the Purim spiel is not limited to that subject. Wearing of costumes and masks is also very common. These may be an outgrowth of Purim plays, but there are several theories as to the origin of the custom, most related in some way to the "hidden" nature of the miracles of Purim.

Purim carnivals of various types have also become customary. In Israel there are festive parades, known as Ad-D'lo-Yada, in the town's main street. The largest and most renowned is in Holon.

Most Jews celebrate Purim on 14 Adar, the day of celebration after the Jews defeated their enemies. Because Jews in the capital city of Shushan fought with their enemies an extra day, Purim is celebrated a day later there, on the day known as שושן פורים, Shushan Purim. This observance was expanded to "walled cities", which are defined as cities "walled since the time of Joshua". In practice, there are no Jews living in Shushan (Shush, Iran), and Shushan Purim is observed fully only in Jerusalem. Cities like Safed and Tiberias also partially observe Shushan Purim. Elsewhere, Shushan Purim is marked only by a small increase in festivity, including a prohibition on fasting, and slight changes in the liturgy.

Pesach—Passover
 Erev Pesach and Fast of the Firstborn, ("Ta'anit Bechorot"): 14 Nisan
 Pesach (Passover): 15–21 Nisan (outside Israel 15–22 Nisan)
 The first day and last day of Passover (outside Israel, first two and last two days) are full yom tov, while the remainder of Passover has the status of Chol Hamoed, "intermediate days".
 Pesach Sheni (second Passover): 14 Iyar

Month of Nisan
As a rule, the month of Nisan is considered to be one of extra joy. Traditionally, throughout the entire month, Tahanun is omitted from the prayer service, many public mourning practices (such as delivering a eulogy at a funeral) are eliminated, and voluntary fasting is prohibited. However, practices sometimes vary.

Eve of Passover and Fast of the Firstborn

The day before Passover (Erev Pesach, lit., "Passover eve") is significant for three reasons:
 It is the day that all of the involved preparations for Passover, especially elimination of leavened food, or chametz, must be completed. In particular, a formal search for remaining chametz is done during the evening of Erev Pesach, and all remaining chametz is finally destroyed, disposed of or nullified during the morning of Erev Pesach.
 It is the day observed as the Fast of the Firstborn (תענית בכורות). Jews who are firstborn fast, in remembrance of the tenth plague, when God killed the Egyptian firstborn, while sparing the Jewish firstborn. This fast is overridden by a seudat mitzvah, a meal celebrating the fulfillment of a commandment; accordingly, it is almost universal for firstborn Jews to attend such a meal on this day so as to obviate their need to fast.
 During the era of the Temple in Jerusalem, the Korban Pesach, or sacrifice of the Paschal Lamb, was carried out the afternoon of 14 Nisan in anticipation of its consumption on Passover night.

When Passover starts on Sunday, and the eve of Passover is therefore Shabbat, the above schedule is altered. See Eve of Passover on Shabbat for details.

Passover

Passover (פּסח) (Pesach), also known liturgically as חג המצות ("Ḥag haMatzot", the "Festival of Unleavened Bread"), is one of the Three Pilgrimage Festivals (shalosh regalim) mentioned in the Torah. Passover commemorates the Exodus, the liberation of the Israelite slaves from Egypt. No chametz (leavened food) is eaten, or even owned, during the week of Passover, in commemoration of the biblical narrative in which the Israelites left Egypt so quickly that their bread did not have enough time to rise. Observant Jews go to great lengths to remove all chametz from their homes and offices in the run-up to Passover.

Along with the avoidance of chametz, the principal ritual unique to this holiday is the seder. The seder, meaning "order", is an ordered ritual meal eaten on the first night of Passover, and outside Israel also on the second night. This meal is known for its distinctive ritual foods—matzo (unleavened bread), maror (bitter herbs), and four cups of wine—as well as its prayer text/handbook/study guide, the Haggadah. Participation in a Passover seder is one of the most widely observed Jewish rituals, even among less affiliated or less observant Jews.

Passover lasts seven days in Israel, and eight days outside Israel. The holiday of the last day of Passover (outside Israel, last two days) commemorates the Splitting of the Red Sea; according to tradition this occurred on the seventh day of Passover.

Pesach SheniPesach Sheni (פסח שני) ("Second Passover") is a day prescribed in the Torah to allow those who did not bring the Paschal Lamb offering (Korban Pesach) a second chance to do so. Eligibility was limited to those who were distant from Jerusalem on Passover, or those who were ritually impure and ineligible to participate in a sacrificial offering. Today, some have the custom to eat matzo on Pesach Sheni, and some make a small change to the liturgy.

Sefirah—Counting of the Omer

 Sefirat HaOmer (Counting of the Omer): 16 Nisan – 5 Sivan Sefirah (lit. "Counting"; more fully, Sefirat HaOmer, "Counting of the Omer") (ספירת העומר), is the 49-day period between the biblical pilgrimage festivals of Passover and Shavuot. The Torah states that this period is to be counted, both in days and in weeks. The first day of this period is the day of the first grain offering of the new year's crop, an omer of barley. The day following the 49th day of the period is the festival of Shavuot; the Torah specifies a grain offering of wheat on that day.

Symbolically, this period has come to represent the spiritual development of the Israelites from slaves in the polytheistic society of Ancient Egypt to free, monotheistic people worthy of the revelation of the Torah, traditionally said to have occurred on Shavuot. Spiritual development remains a key rabbinic teaching of this period.

Sefirah has long been observed as a period of semi-mourning. The customary explanation cites a plague that killed 24,000 students of Rabbi Akiva (BT Yevamot 62b). In broad terms, the mourning practices observed include limiting actual celebrations (such as weddings), not listening to music, not wearing new clothing, and not shaving or taking a haircut. There is a wide variety of practice as to the specifics of this observance.  See Counting of the Omer (Semi-mourning).

Lag Ba'Omer

 Lag Ba'Omer: 18 IyarLag Ba'Omer is the 33rd day in the Omer count ( is the number 33 in Hebrew). By Ashkenazi practice, the semi-mourning observed during the period of Sefirah (see above) is lifted on Lag Ba'Omer, while Sefardi practice is to lift it at the end of Lag Ba'Omer. Minor liturgical changes are made on Lag Ba'omer; because mourning practices are suspended, weddings are often conducted on this day.

Lag Ba'Omer is identified as the Yom Hillula (yahrzeit) of Rabbi Shimon bar Yochai, one of the leading Tannaim (teachers quoted in the Mishna) and ascribed author of the core text of Kabbalah, the Zohar. Customary celebrations include bonfires, picnics, and bow and arrow play by children. Boys sometimes receive their first haircuts on Lag Ba'Omer, while Hasidic rebbes hold tishes in honor of the day.

In Israel, Lag Ba'Omer is associated with the Bar Kokhba revolt against the Roman Empire. In Zionist thought, the plague that decimated Rabbi Akiva's 24,000 disciples is explained as a veiled reference to the revolt; the 33rd day representing the end of the plague is explained as the day of Bar Kokhba's victory. The traditional bonfires and bow-and-arrow play were thus reinterpreted as celebrations of military victory. In this vein, the order originally creating the Israel Defense Forces was issued on Lag Ba'Omer 1948, 13 days after Israel declared independence.

Shavuot—Feast of Weeks—Yom HaBikurim

 Erev Shavuot: 5 Sivan
 Shavuot: 6 (and outside Israel: 7) SivanShavuot, the Feast of Weeks, is one of the three pilgrimage festivals (Shalosh regalim) ordained in the Torah. Different from other biblical holidays, the date for Shavuot is not explicitly fixed in the Torah. Instead, it is observed on the day following the 49th and final day in the counting of the Omer. In the current era of the fixed Jewish calendar, this puts the date of Shavuot as 6 Sivan. In Israel and in Reform Judaism, it is a one-day holiday; elsewhere, it is a two-day holiday extending through 7 Sivan.

According to Rabbinic tradition, codified in the Talmud at Shabbat 87b, the Ten Commandments were given on this day. In the era of the Temple, there were certain specific offerings mandated for Shavuot, and Shavuot was the first day for bringing of Bikkurim to the Temple.  Other than those, there are no explicit mitzvot unique to Shavuot given in the Torah (parallel to matzo on Passover or Sukkah on Sukkot).

Nevertheless, there are a number of widespread customs observed on Shavuot. During this holiday the Torah portion containing the Ten Commandments is read in the synagogue, and the biblical Book of Ruth is read as well. It is traditional to eat dairy meals during Shavuot. In observant circles, all night Torah study is common on the first night of Shavuot, while in Reform Judaism, Shavuot is the customary date for Confirmation ceremonies.

Mourning for Jerusalem: Seventeenth of Tammuz and Tisha B'Av
The three-week period starting on 17 Tammuz and concluding after Tisha B'Av has traditionally been observed as a period of mourning for the destruction of Jerusalem and the Holy Temple there.

Fast of the Seventeenth of Tammuz

 Shiva Asar B'Tammuz: 17 Tammuz
The Seventeenth of Tamuz (שבעה עשר בתמוז, Shiva Asar B'Tamuz) traditionally marks the first breach in the walls of the Jerusalem during the Roman conquest in 70 CE, at the end of the Second Temple period.  According to tradition, this day has had negative connotations since Moses broke the first set of tablets on this day.  The Mishnah cites five negative events that happened on 17 Tammuz.

This fast is observed like other minor fasts (see Tzom Gedalia, above). When this fast falls out on Shabbat, its observance is postponed until Sunday.

The Three Weeks and the Nine Days

 The Three Weeks: 17 Tammuz – 9 Av
 The Nine Days: 1–9 Av
 The Week of Tisha B'Av (beginning at the conclusion of Shabbat preceding Tisha B'Av)

The period between the fasts of 17 Tammuz and 9 Av, known as the "Three Weeks" (Hebrew:  בין המצרים, "between the straits"), features a steadily increasing level of mourning practices as Tisha B'Av approaches. Ashkenazi Jews refrain from conducting weddings and other joyful events throughout the period unless the date is established by Jewish law (as for a bris or pidyon haben). They do not cut their hair during this period. Starting on the first of Av and throughout the nine days between the 1st and 9th days of Av, Ashkenazim traditionally refrain from eating meat and drinking wine, except on Shabbat or at a Seudat Mitzvah (a Mitzvah meal, such as for a bris or siyum). They also refrain from bathing for pleasure. Sefardic practice varies some from this; the less severe restrictions usually begin on 1 Av, while the more severe restrictions apply during the week of Tisha B'Av itself.

Subject to the variations described above, Orthodox Judaism continues to maintain the traditional prohibitions.  In Conservative Judaism, the Rabbinical Assembly's Committee on Jewish Law and Standards has issued several responsa (legal rulings) which hold that the prohibitions against weddings in this timeframe are deeply held traditions, but should not be construed as binding law. Thus, Conservative Jewish practice would allow weddings during this time, except on the 17th of Tammuz and 9th of Av themselves. Rabbis within Reform Judaism and Reconstructionist Judaism hold that halakha (Jewish law) is no longer binding and follow their individual consciences on such matters. Nevertheless, the rabbinical manual of the Reform movement encourages Reform rabbis not to conduct weddings on Tisha B'Av itself "out of historical consciousness and respect" for the Jewish community.

Tisha B'Av—Ninth of Av

 Tisha B'Av : 9 AvTisha B'Av is a major fast day and day of mourning. A Midrashic tradition states that the spies' negative report concerning the Land of Israel was delivered on Tisha B'Av. Consequently, the day became auspicious for negative events in Jewish history. Most notably, both the First Temple, originally built by King Solomon, and the Second Temple of Roman times were destroyed on Tisha B'Av. Other calamities throughout Jewish history are said to have taken place on Tisha B'Av, including King Edward I's edict compelling the Jews to leave England (1290) and the Jewish expulsion from Spain in 1492.

Tisha B'Av is a major fast. It is a 25-hour fast, running from sundown to nightfall. As on Yom Kippur, not only are eating and drinking prohibited, but also bathing, anointing, marital relations and the wearing of leather shoes.  Work is not prohibited, as on biblical holidays, but is discouraged. In the evening, the Book of Lamentations is read in the synagogue, while in the morning lengthy kinot, poems of elegy, are recited. From evening until noon mourning rituals resembling those of shiva are observed, including sitting on low stools or the floor; after noon those restrictions are somewhat lightened, in keeping with the tradition that Messiah will be born on Tisha B'Av.

While the fast ends at nightfall of 9–10 Av, the restrictions of the Three Weeks and Nine Days continue through noon on 10 Av because the Second Temple continued to burn through most of that day. When 9 Av falls on Shabbat, when fasting is prohibited, the fast is postponed until 10 Av. In that case, the restrictions of the Three Weeks and Nine Days end with the fast, except for the prohibition against eating meat and drinking wine, which extend until the morning of 10 Av.

Tu B'Av

 Tu B'Av: 15 AvTu B'av (ט״ו באב), lit. "15th of Av", is a day mentioned in the Talmud alongside Yom Kippur as "happiest of the year". It was a day celebrating the bringing of wood used for the Temple Service, as well as a day when marriages were arranged. Today, it is marked by a small change in liturgy. In modern Israel, the day has become somewhat of an analog to Valentine's Day.

Other fasts

Several other fast days of ancient or medieval origin continue to be observed to some degree in modern times. Such continued observance is usually by Orthodox Jews only, and is not universal today even among Orthodox Jews.

 Fasts for droughts and other public troubles. Much of the Talmudic tractate Ta'anit is devoted to the proclamation and execution of public fasts. The most detailed description refers to fasts in times of drought in the Land of Israel. Apparently these fasts included a Ne'ilah (closing) prayer, a prayer now reserved for recitation on Yom Kippur only.
While the specific fasts described in the Mishnah fell into disuse once Jews were exiled from the land of Israel, various Jewish communities have declared fasts over the years, using these as a model. Two examples include a fast among Polish Jews commemorating the massacre of Jews during the Khmelnytsky Uprising and one among Russian Jews during anti-Jewish pogroms of the 1880s. 
Since the establishment of the State of Israel, the Chief Rabbinate of Israel has urged fasting in times of drought. 
 Behab (בה"ב). The fasts of bet-hey-bet—Monday-Thursday-Monday—were established as a vehicle for atonement from possible excesses during the extended holiday periods of Passover and Sukkot. They are proclaimed on the first Shabbat of the month of Iyar following Passover, and Marcheshvan following Sukkot. Based on the model of Mishnah Ta'anit, they are then observed on the Monday, Thursday and Monday following that Shabbat.
 Yom Kippur Katan ("little Yom Kippur"). These fasts originated in the sixteenth-century Kabbalistic community of Safed. They are conceptually linked to the sin-offerings that were brought to the Temple in Jerusalem on each Rosh Chodesh. These fasts are observed on the day before Rosh Chodesh in most months.

Israeli/Jewish national holidays and days of remembrance

As a general rule, the biblical Jewish holidays (Sabbath, Rosh Hashanah, Yom Kippur, Passover, Shavuot, Sukkot and Purim) are observed as public holidays in Israel. Chanukah is a school holiday, but businesses remain open. On Tisha B'Av, restaurants and places of entertainment are closed.  Other Jewish holidays listed above are observed in varying ways and to varying degrees.

Between the creation of the State of Israel in 1948 and the aftermath of the Six-Day War, the Knesset, generally in consultation with the Chief Rabbinate of Israel, established four national holidays or days of remembrance:

 Yom HaShoah: Holocaust Remembrance Day
 Yom Hazikaron: Memorial Day
 Yom Ha'atzmaut: Israel Independence Day
 Yom Yerushalayim: Jerusalem Day

The status of these days as religious events is not uniform within the Jewish world.  Non-Orthodox, Religious Zionist and Modern Orthodox Jewish religious movements accept these days as religious as well as national in nature.

As a rule, these four days are not accepted as religious observances by most Haredi Jews, including Hasidim.  Some ḥaredim are opposed to the existence of the State of Israel altogether on religious grounds; others simply feel that there are not sufficient grounds under Jewish law to justify the establishment of new religious holidays.  For details, see Haredim and Zionism.

Observance of these days in Jewish communities outside Israel is typically more muted than their observance in Israel. Events held in government and public venues within Israel are often held in Jewish communal settings (synagogues and community centers) abroad.

More recently, the Knesset established two additional holidays:

 Yom HaAliyah: Aliyah Day
 A day to commemorate the expulsion of Jews from Arab lands and Iran

Finally, the Israeli government also recognizes several ethnic Jewish observances with holiday status.

Yom HaShoah—Holocaust Remembrance Day

 Yom HaShoah: (nominally) 27 NisanYom HaShoah (lit. "Holocaust Day") is a day of remembrance for victims of the Holocaust.  Its full name is Yom Hazikaron LaShoah v'LiGevurah (lit. "Holocaust and Heroism Remembrance Day"), and reflects a desire to recognize martyrs who died in active resistance to the Nazis alongside those who died as passive victims.  Its date, 27 Nisan, was chosen because it commemorates the Warsaw Ghetto uprising, the best known of the armed Jewish uprisings.In contrast, International Holocaust Remembrance Day is observed on January 27, the day the Auschwitz-Birkenau camp was liberated in 1945.

Places of public entertainment are closed throughout Israel in recognition of the day.  Public commemoration of Yom HaShoah usually includes religious elements such as the recitation of Psalms, memorial prayers, and kaddish, and the lighting of memorial candles.  In Israel, the most notable observances are the State memorial ceremony at Yad Vashem and the sirens marking off a two-minute silence at 10:00 am.  Religious Zionist and Modern Orthodox Jews generally participate in such public observances along with secular Jews and Jews who adhere to more liberal religious movements.  Outside Israel, Jewish communities observe Yom HaShoah in addition to or instead of their countries' Holocaust Memorial Days. Probably the most notable commemoration is the March of the Living, held at the site of Auschwitz-Birkenau, attended by Jews from all parts of the world.

Outside Orthodoxy, a liturgy for Yom HaShoah is beginning to develop.  The Conservative, Reform and Reconstructionist prayer books all include liturgical elements for Yom HaShoah, to be added to the regular weekday prayers. Conservative Judaism has written a scroll, called Megillat HaShoah, intended to become a definitive liturgical reading for Yom HaShoah. The Orthodox world–even the segment that participates publicly in Yom HaShoah–has been reluctant to write a liturgy for the day, preferring to compose Kinnot (prayers of lamentation) for recitation on Tisha B'Av.Along with the ḥaredi resistance to new days of commemoration, there is a reluctance to introduce unnecessary mourning during the month of Nisan (see above).

In order to ensure that public Yom HaShoah ceremonies in Israel do not violate Shabbat prohibitions, the date for Yom HaShoah varies as follows:
If 27 Nisan occurs on a Friday, the observance of Yom HaShoah is advanced to the previous day (Thursday, 26 Nisan).
If 27 Nisan occurs on a Sunday, the observance of Yom HaShoah is delayed to the following day (Monday, 28 Nisan).

Yom Hazikaron—Memorial Day

 Yom Hazikaron: (nominally) 4 IyarYom Hazikaron (lit. "Memorial Day") is a day of remembrance of the fallen of Israel's wars. During the first years of Israel's independence, this remembrance was observed on Yom Ha'atzmaut (Independence Day) itself.  However, by 1951, the memorial observance was separated from the festive celebration of Independence Day and moved to its current date, the day before Yom Ha'atzmaut.As early as 1940, 4 Iyar had been established as a memorial day for victims of Arab attacks.  See  Since 2000, the scope of the memorial has expanded to include civilians slain by acts of hostile terrorism.  Its full name is now  ("Day of Remembrance for the Fallen of the Battles of Israel and the Victims of Terror").

Places of public entertainment are closed throughout Israel in recognition of the day.  Many schools, businesses and other institutions conduct memorial services on this day, and it is customary to visit the graves of fallen soldiers and to recite memorial prayers there.  The principal public observances are the evening opening ceremony at the Western Wall and the morning services of remembrance at military cemeteries throughout the country, each opened by the sounding of sirens.  The public observances conclude with the service at the military cemetery on Mount Herzl that serves as the transition to Yom Ha'atzmaut.

Outside Israel, Yom HaZikaron observances are often folded into Yom Ha'atzmaut celebrations.  Within Israel, Yom Hazikaron is always the day before Yom Ha'atzmaut, but that date moves to prevent violation of Sabbath prohibitions during the ceremonies of either day.  See following section for details.

Yom Ha'atzmaut—Israel Independence Day

 Yom Ha'atzmaut: (nominally) 5 IyarYom Ha'atzmaut is Israel's Independence Day. Observance of this day by Jews inside and outside Israel is widespread,  and varies in tone from secular (military parades and barbecues) to religious (recitation of Hallel and new liturgies).

Although Israel's independence was declared on a Friday, the Chief Rabbinate has long been mindful of the possibility of Yom Ha'atzmaut (and Yom Hazikaron) observances leading to violation of Sabbath prohibitions.  To prevent such violations, the dates of Yom Hazikaron and Yom Ha'atzmaut vary as follows:
If 4–5 Iyar occur on a Sunday-Monday, the observances are delayed to Monday-Tuesday, 5–6 Iyar.
If 4–5 Iyar occur on a Tuesday-Wednesday, the observances are not moved.
If 4–5 Iyar occur on a Thursday-Friday, the observances are advanced to Wednesday-Thursday, 3–4 Iyar.
If 4–5 Iyar occur on a Friday-Shabbat, the observances are advanced to Wednesday-Thursday, 2–3 Iyar.

Nearly all non-ḥaredi Jewish religious communities have incorporated changes or enhancements to the liturgy in honor of Yom Ha'atzmaut and suspend the mourning practices of the period of Sefirat Ha'Omer.  (See Yom Ha'atzmaut—Religious Customs for details.)  Within the Religious Zionist and Modern Orthodox communities, these changes are not without controversy, and customs continue to evolve.Ḥaredi religious observance of Yom Ha'atzmaut varies widely.  A few ḥaredim (especially Sefardic Ḥaredim) celebrate the day in a reasonably similar way to the way non-ḥaredim do.  Most ḥaredim simply treat the day indifferently; i.e., as a regular day.  And finally others (notably Satmar Ḥasidim and Neturei Karta) mourn on the day because of their opposition to the enterprise of the State of Israel.

Yom Yerushalayim—Jerusalem Day
 Yom Yerushalayim: 28 Iyar

Jerusalem Day marks the 1967 reunification of Jerusalem under Israeli control during the Six-Day War. This marked the first time in 19 years that the Temple Mount was accessible to Jews, and the first time since the destruction of the Second Temple 1897 years earlier that the Temple Mount was under Jewish political control.

As with Yom Ha'atzmaut, celebrations of Yom Yerushalayim range from completely secular (including hikes to Jerusalem and a large parade through downtown Jerusalem) to religious (recitation of Hallel and new liturgies). Although Haredim do not participate in the liturgical changes, they are somewhat more likely to celebrate Yom Yerushalayim than the other modern Israeli holidays because of the importance of the liberation of the Western Wall and the Old City of Jerusalem.

Outside Israel, observance of Yom Yerushalayim is widespread, especially in Orthodox circles. It has not gained as widespread acceptance as Yom Ha'atzmaut, especially among more politically liberal Jews, because of the continuing conflicts over the future of the city.

Yom Yerushalayim has not traditionally moved to avoid Shabbat desecration, although in 2012 the Chief Rabbinate began some efforts in that direction.

Yom HaAliyah—Aliyah Day
 Yom HaAliyah: 10 Nisan

Aliyah Day is an Israeli national holiday celebrated annually on the tenth of Nisan. The day was established to acknowledge Aliyah, immigration to the Jewish state, as a core value of the State of Israel, and honor the ongoing contributions of Olim (immigrants) to Israeli society.

Immigration to Israel is a recognized religious value of Judaism, sometimes referred to as the Gathering of Israel. The date chosen for Yom HaAliyah, 10 Nisan, has religious significance: it is the day on which Joshua and the Israelites crossed the Jordan River at Gilgal into the Promised Land. It was thus the first documented "mass Aliyah". The alternative date observed in the school system, 7 Heshvan, falls during the week of the Torah portion in which God instructs Abraham to leave his home and his family and go up to the Land of Israel.

At the present time, observance of this day appears to be secular in nature.

Day to commemorate the expulsion of Jews from Arab lands and Iran
 Day to Mark the Departure and Expulsion of Jews from the Arab Countries and Iran: 30 November (on the Gregorian calendar)

The Knesset established this observance in 2014. The purpose of this observance is to recognize the collective trauma of Mizrahi Jews during the period around the establishment of the State of Israel. Many Mizrachi Jews felt that their own suffering was being ignored, both in comparison to the suffering of European Jewry during the Holocaust and in comparison to the Palestinian Nakba. The Gregorian-calendar date chosen is the day after the United Nations Partition Plan for Palestine was adopted, as that date marked the beginning of concentrated pressure and hostility against the community.

At the present time, observance of this day appears to be secular in nature.

Ethnic holidays

The Israeli government officially recognizes three traditional holidays of ethnic Jewish communities in Israel. These days are also observed by their respective communities outside Israel.
 Mimouna began as a holiday among Moroccan Jews, while similar celebrations also exist among Turkish Jews and Persian Jews. These festivals are observed on the day after Passover, when the eating of ordinary food ("chametz") resumes. In Israel, the observance of Mimouna has spread widely in recent years; it has been estimated that up to two million Jews who live in Israel now participate in Mimouna celebrations.
 On the evening concluding Passover, the celebration centers on visiting the homes of friends and neighbors, Jewish and non-Jewish. A variety of traditional foods are served, and symbols which represent good luck and prosperity are prominently displayed. The next day, barbecues and picnics are among the most widespread activities of the celebration.
 The Seharane was celebrated by Kurdish Jews as a multi-day nature festival starting the day after Passover. Communities would leave their villages and camp out for several days, celebrating with eating and drinking, nature walks, singing and dancing. 
 Its observance was interrupted after the relocation of this community to Israel in the 1950s. In recent years it has been revived. But because of the already-widespread celebration of Mimouna in Israel, the celebration of the Seharane was moved to Chol HaMoed Sukkot. 
 The Sigd began among the Beta Israel (Ethiopian) community as a variation of the observance of Yom Kippur. Currently that community now observes it in addition to Yom Kippur; its date is 29 Heshvan, 49 days after Yom Kippur. It shares some features of Yom Kippur, Shavuot, and other holidays.
 The Sigd is modeled on a ceremony of fasting, study and prayer described in Nehemiah 8, when the Jews rededicated themselves to religious observance on return to Israel after the Babylonian exile. In Ethiopia, the community would gather on a mountaintop and pray for a return to Jerusalem. The modern Sigd is centered on a promenade overlooking the Old City of Jerusalem. The day's observance ends with a celebratory break fast.

See also

 Chabad holidays
 Jewish greetings
 Jewish and Israeli holidays 2000–2050
 List of observances set by the Hebrew calendar
 List of Gregorian Jewish-related and Israeli holidays
 Religious festival
 Yom Tov Torah readings

 Explanatory notes

References

 Further reading 
 Brofsky, David. Hilkhot Moadim: Understanding the Laws of the Festivals. Jerusalem: Koren Publishers, 2013.  
 Greenberg, Irving.  The Jewish Way: Living the Holidays.  New York: Touchstone, 1988.
 Renberg, Dalia H.  The Complete Family Guide to Jewish Holidays.  New York: Adama, 1985.
 Strassfeld, Michael.  The Jewish Holidays: A Guide and Commentary''. New York: Harper & Row, 1985.

External links
 Jewish Holidays Online List of all Jewish holidays for the current year (or any given year)
 Jewish holiday calendars & Hebrew date converter. Hebcal home page. Interactive Jewish calendar with candle lighting times and Torah readings.
 Jewish Holidays Hebcal. Major and Minor holidays and fasts for 6 Jewish year
 Four-year calendar of major Jewish holidays; Summary Explanation of the Jewish Holidays. JewishColumbus
 Jewish Holidays. Upcoming Holidays, links to others; at Orthodox Union. 
 JewishGen Jewish Festival Dates calculator of the dates of Jewish holidays 
 Jewish Holidays: A Primer Patheos
 What are the main Jewish festivals? BBC

 
Holiday
Public holidays in Israel
Religious holidays